Oxycopis floridana is a species of false blister beetle in the family Oedemeridae. It is known from Florida and the Bahamas.

References

Further reading

 

Oedemeridae
Beetles of the United States
Fauna of the Bahamas
Beetles described in 1896
Taxa named by George Henry Horn
Articles created by Qbugbot